Phoenix Tower (formerly PGV Tower) is a class A office building located in the city of Bucharest, Romania. It stands at a height of 65 meters and has 15 floors, with a total surface of 11,500 square metres. The building is owned by DEGI, the real estate branch of insurance giants Allianz.

References

External links

Skyscraper office buildings in Bucharest
Office buildings completed in 2006